James Jay Jaccard (born September 13, 1949) is an American psychologist and social work researcher. He is a Professor of Social Work at New York University's Silver School of Social Work. He received his Ph.D. from the University of Illinois at Urbana–Champaign in 1976. He helped to design the National Longitudinal Study of Adolescent to Adult Health (also known as Add Health). In 2016, he was inducted into the American Academy of Social Work and Social Welfare.

References

External links
Faculty page

Profile at Social Psychology Network
Author James-Jaccard Guilford Press.

Living people
American social psychologists
1949 births
New York University faculty
University of Illinois Urbana-Champaign alumni
American social workers
Social work scholars